Dean Gary Parrett (born 16 November 1991) is an English professional footballer who plays as a midfielder for Biggleswade Town. He has played in the Football League for several clubs and has represented England from under-16 to under-20 level.

Career

Tottenham Hotspur
Born in Hampstead, London, Parrett signed for the Tottenham Hotspur Academy from Queens Park Rangers in February 2007. He made his first team debut for Tottenham in a UEFA Cup match against Shakhtar Donetsk on 19 February 2009. He joined League Two team Aldershot Town on a month's loan on 17 September. Aldershot enquired for an extension but instead Parrett returned to Spurs on 23 October after playing four games. He signed a new three-year contract at White Hart Lane in August 2010, before joining Plymouth Argyle on loan until the end of the 2010–11 season. He scored his first career goal whilst at Plymouth in a 3–1 win over Bristol Rovers. On 10 November 2010, it was mutually agreed between Tottenham and Argyle that Parrett's loan be cut short and he returned to Tottenham.

In March 2011, Parrett signed for League One side Charlton Athletic on loan until the end of the 2010–11 season. He scored once for Charlton in a 3–1 win over Rochdale.

On 13 January 2012, Parrett signed on loan with Yeovil Town for one month, which was extended until the end of the season on 8 February 2012, and he scored in the 3–2 win over Colchester United on 18 February 2012.

On 28 March 2013, Parrett sign to Swindon Town on loan along with fellow Spurs trainees Nathan Byrne and Massimo Luongo. The very next day he went straight into the squad to face Oldham and play the full 90 minutes in a 1–1 result.

Swindon terminated the loan abruptly on 11 April 2013 with Manager, Kevin MacDonald unwilling to explain the reason publicly.
Parrett returned to Tottenham and was subsequently released by the club in June 2013.

Stevenage
On 17 October 2013, Stevenage signed Parrett who was a free agent till the end of the 2013–14 season. On 12 May 2014, Parrett signed a new contract extension at the club.

AFC Wimbledon
On 1 July 2016, Parrett left Stevenage for newly promoted League One club AFC Wimbledon, joining former Stevenage teammates Darius Charles and Chris Whelpdale. He scored his first goal for the club, a penalty, in a 2–0 win over Gillingham on 1 October 2016.

Gillingham
On 30 May 2018 Parrett signed for Gillingham. He made his debut for the club on 4 August 2018, in a League One fixture away to Accrington Stanley. He made 31 appearances for the club in total, scoring one goal.

Return to Stevenage
After his contract was terminated by Gillingham in July 2019, Parrett rejoined Stevenage. Parrett was released by the club at the end of the 2019–20 season which saw Stevenage relegated to the National League. He made a total of 22 appearances across all competitions for the club in his second spell, scoring one goal in a 1–2 loss to Southend in the EFL Cup.

Wealdstone
Parrett joined Wealdstone on 21 November 2020 on a non-contract basis.

Barnet
The following month, the Stones allowed Parrett to begin talks with Barnet over a move. Parrett joined the Bees on a short-term deal on 12 December 2020. He was released on 8 January 2021 after only two appearances.

Later career
In March 2022, Parrett signed for Southern League Premier Division Central side Biggleswade Town.

Career statistics

References

External links

Dean Parrett profile at Tottenham Hotspur
Dean Parrett England stats at The Football Association

1991 births
Living people
Footballers from Hampstead
English footballers
England youth international footballers
Association football midfielders
English Football League players
National League (English football) players
Southern Football League players
Queens Park Rangers F.C. players
Tottenham Hotspur F.C. players
Aldershot Town F.C. players
Plymouth Argyle F.C. players
Charlton Athletic F.C. players
Yeovil Town F.C. players
Swindon Town F.C. players
Stevenage F.C. players
Gillingham F.C. players
Wealdstone F.C. players
Barnet F.C. players
Biggleswade Town F.C. players